

External links

2010 in United States case law